Vasyl' Matviyovych Shakhrai (February 11, 1888 – 1919) was a Ukrainian political activist and Bolshevik revolutionary during the Russian Revolution. He was а founder of what came to be called  National Communism.

Biography
Shakhrai joined the Bolsheviks after completing his training at the Military Academy in Poltava in 1917, while some sources claim that he was a member and activist of Bolsheviks since 1913. He was one of the few Ukrainians amongst the Poltava Bolsheviks. At the time the Bolsheviks were in a unified organisation with the local Mensheviks, but Shakhrai supported Serhii Mazlakh, a Poltava Bolshevik who successfully ousted the Mensheviks by August 1917.

Shakhrai and Mazlakh were then elected editors of the weekly newspaper. By this time Shakhrai was supporting Ukrainian national interests within the party. Although this caused concern amongst the predominantly Jewish local Mensheviks, he gained support amongst local Bolsheviks, who felt that it helped gain support amongst the largely anti-Russian Ukrainians of the region. Shakhrai was elected as a delegate to both the First All-Ukrainian Consultative Conference of the CP(b)U and the First All Ukrainian Congress of Soviets. He was also appointed the People's Commissar for Military Affairs in the Soviet Ukrainian government. In this capacity he accompanied Trotsky to Brest Litovsk for the treaty negotiations there in March 1918.

He was concerned about the suppression of Ukrainian cultural organizations by Russian Bolshevik troops who were sent to Ukraine in January and February 1918. Lenin consented to the dismemberment of Ukraine through the founding of the Donets-Krivoy Rog Soviet Republic as a ruse to place it outside the terms of the Brest Litovsk Treaty. Although this stratagem failed, it further raised concerns for Shakrai as regards to how the Bolsheviks were treating Ukraine. This concern was increased when Lenin gave a speech in November 1918, which called upon party functionaries to consider themselves Russian patriots. By December 1918 his alienation from the Bolsheviks was more or less complete.

His pamphlet The Revolution in Ukraine was published in November 1918, followed by On the Current Situation in Ukraine in January 1919. It led to Shakhrai expulsion from the CP(b)U in June 1919.

Shakhrai then went to Saratov, then occupied by Anton Denikin's White Volunteer Army. Here he worked on a number of underground newspapers, before being arrested and shot by Denikin's administration in autumn 1919.

Further reading
 On The Current Situation in the Ukraine, by Vasyl' Shakhrai and Serhii Mazlakh, edited by P. Potichnyj, University of Michigan Press, 1970

References

External links
 Yurenko, O. Vasyl Shakhrai (ШАХРАЙ Василь Матвійович). Encyclopedia of History of Ukraine.

Velychenko S.,"Why ukrainian communists condemned russian bolsheviks as imperialists. Two previously unknown articles by vasyl-shakhrai."  

1888 births
1919 deaths
People from Poltava Oblast
People from Piryatinsky Uyezd
People of the Russian Civil War
Old Bolsheviks
Ukrainian communists
Russian Revolution in Ukraine
Ukrainian politicians before 1991
Soviet defence ministers of Ukraine
20th-century executions
Ukrainian revolutionaries
Executed Ukrainian people
Ukrainian defectors
Soviet people of the Ukrainian–Soviet War